The close back unrounded vowel, or high back unrounded vowel, is a type of vowel sound used in some spoken languages.

Features

Occurrence

See also
Index of phonetics articles
Ɯ

Notes

References

External links
 

Close vowels
Back vowels
Unrounded vowels